Aracely Escalante Jasso (born 17 July 1943) is a Mexican politician affiliated with the Institutional Revolutionary Party. As of 2014 she served as Senator of the LVIII and LIX Legislatures of the Mexican Congress representing Campeche and as Deputy of the LVII and LX Legislatures.

She also owns an AM/FM radio station in her hometown, XHBCC-FM/XEBCC-AM 100.5/1030.

References

1943 births
Living people
Politicians from Ciudad del Carmen
Members of the Senate of the Republic (Mexico)
Members of the Chamber of Deputies (Mexico)
Institutional Revolutionary Party politicians
21st-century Mexican politicians
21st-century Mexican women politicians
Women members of the Chamber of Deputies (Mexico)
Women members of the Senate of the Republic (Mexico)
Members of the Congress of Campeche
20th-century Mexican politicians
20th-century Mexican women politicians